The Mayor of Castro Street is a 1982 biography of Harvey Milk, written by Randy Shilts.

Critical reception
Kirkus Reviews wrote that "Shilts' interwoven account of the emergence of San Francisco as a gay mecca--and the accompanying rise in gays' political clout--is first-rate."

Adaptations 
 In April 2007, Participant Media closed a deal with Warner Independent to turn the book into a film. However, the film appears to have stalled in "development hell," as no further news about development, casting or production has emerged. The intended adaptation was unrelated to the Academy Award-winning fictional film about Harvey Milk's life,  Milk, or to an earlier documentary, The Times of Harvey Milk.
 In 2009, Audible.com produced an audio version of The Mayor of Castro Street, narrated by Marc Vietor, as part of its Modern Vanguard line of audiobooks.

References

1980s LGBT literature
1982 non-fiction books
American biographies
Biographies about LGBT people
Books by Randy Shilts
English-language books
Harvey Milk
LGBT politics in the United States
LGBT literature in the United States